Brunellia morii is a species of plant in the Brunelliaceae family. Endemic to Panama, it is threatened by habitat loss.

References

Flora of Panama
morii
Endangered plants
Taxonomy articles created by Polbot